Life of St. Paul is a series of five short films about Paul the Apostle produced by G.H.W. Productions. They were released in 1938. They were shot at Pinewood Studios and Nettlefold Studios in England.

Plot

References

External links

Film series introduced in 1938
1938 short films
British short films
Cultural depictions of Paul the Apostle
Films about Christianity
Films based on the New Testament
Films set in ancient Rome
Films set in Jerusalem
Films set in the 1st century
Films shot at Nettlefold Studios
Films shot at Pinewood Studios
Short film series